Nageswari  is a 2001 Tamil-language devotional film written and directed by Rama Narayanan. The film featured Ramya Krishnan in the title role alongside Karan and Vadivelu, while Vivek plays a supporting role. The film, which had music composed by S. A. Rajkumar, released in January 2001.

Cast

Ramya Krishnan as Nageswari / Nagaveni
Karan as Eashwar
Vadivelu
Vivek
Babloo Prithiveeraj
Mayilsamy
Ramesh Khanna
Riyaz Khan
Nizhalgal Ravi
Vennira Aadai Moorthy
Kovai Sarala
Lingeswaran

Soundtrack
Lyrics of the songs were written by Muthulingam, Kalidasan and Pa. Vijay.

Release
The film opened to average reviews, with a critic from The Hindu noting "it is a low budget bhakti sentiment film for women.".

References

External links

2001 films
Hindu devotional films
2000s Tamil-language films
Films directed by Rama Narayanan
Films about snakes
Films about shapeshifting